Indira Devi of Cooch Behar (1892–1968), was the Princess of Baroda State, India, and regent of Cooch Behar.

Indira Devi may also refer to:
 Indira Devi (actress), silent film actress
 Indira Devi of Kapurthala (1912–1979), Indian princess and socialite
 Indira Devi Chaudhurani (1873–1960), Indian musician and composer